Áron Fejős (born 17 April 1997) is a Hungarian football player who plays for Paksi FC.

Career

Paks
On 6 August 2016, Fejős played his first match for Paks in a 0-0 drawn against Ferencváros in the Hungarian League.

Csákvár
On 18 July 2022, Fejős signed with Csákvár.

Career statistics

Club

References

External links

1997 births
People from Senta
Serbian people of Hungarian descent
Living people
Hungarian footballers
Association football midfielders
Kaposvári Rákóczi FC players
Dunaújváros PASE players
Paksi FC players
Szeged-Csanád Grosics Akadémia footballers
Budaörsi SC footballers
Szekszárdi UFC footballers
Csákvári TK players
Nemzeti Bajnokság I players
Nemzeti Bajnokság II players
Nemzeti Bajnokság III players